The Peace Train Organisation was a campaign group set up in 1989 in both the Republic of Ireland and Northern Ireland in response to the repeated bombing of the Dublin to Belfast railway line (see Enterprise (train)) by the Provisional IRA.

 

The founding Chairman of the Peace Train Organisation was the writer and broadcaster Sam McAughtry while the organisation in the Republic of Ireland was headed up by Rev. Christopher Hudson.  Other key figures in the organisation south of the border were the then Workers Party MEP Proinsias De Rossa, Tom French and southern secretary Seán Ó Cionnaith. In the North  key figures included  Paddy Devlin,  Chris and Michael McGimpsey  Dr Liam Kennedy  Mary McMahon   and Eileen Bell.   The administrator  based in  Peace House Belfast  was Jeff Maxwell

The organisation organised a Peace Train from Dublin to Belfast - an actual train hired out for the day which brought hundreds of people across the border from all over Ireland as a symbolic gesture to protest the bombing of the railway line.  The group marched to Belfast City Hall where an open-air rally was held.  The event was not without incident however as a window was broken by a stone-throwing youth and the train was held up by another bomb scare on the line at Portadown.

It was derided as being a Workers Party PR-stunt by many republicans in Sinn Féin and Fianna Fáil.

A number of further Peace Train events were held, including a large rally at Oriel Park football ground in Dundalk, Co. Louth.  A Peace train travelled from Belfast to Dublin, then on to London to highlight the issue at national level  with a rally addressed by  Sam McAughtry , Chris Hudson  and IRA  torture victim  Maurice Healy    There was  also a meeting in the Parliament  Buildings hosted by Harry Barnes MP and Gary Kent

References

External links
Chris Hudson awarded MBE for services to Peace Train Organisation

Peace organisations based in Ireland